Shyamoli Ideal Polytechnic Institute (SIPI) is a private polytechnic institute in Bangladesh for providing 4 years Diploma in Engineering under BTEB. The institute has been established in 1979. It has four campuses located at Dhaka, Chittagong, Rangpur, Lakshmipur.

History
Shyamoli Ideal Polytechnic Institute
To create an enlightened nation Shyamoli Ideal Polytechnic Institute was established in 1979 which has a glorious tradition. Principal M. A. Sattar is the founder of this reputed technical institution. With its journey it has been able to create its own permanent position in the heart of the people of Bangladesh.To meet the needs of technical hands in home and abroad Shyamoli Ideal Polytechnic Institute (SIPI) operates Diploma in Engineering program under Bangladesh Technical Education Board. was 1979 M. A. Sattar started the journey of the institution with some students. Which is currently known as the most reputed private polytechnic institute in Bangladesh. Where today thousands of students are doing diploma courses. At present, the institute has 4 campuses in 4 districts.

Academics

Departments
As of 2019, there are 14 Diploma in Engineering Departments in SIPI 
 Faculty of Civil Engineering
 Department of Civil Engineering
 Department of Architecture 
Faculty of Electrical and Electronic Engineering
 Department of Electrical Engineering
 Department of Electronic Engineering
 Department of Computer Engineering
 Department of Telecommunication Engineering
 Department of Graphic design Engineering
 Faculty of Mechanical Engineering
 Department of Mechanical Engineering
 Department of Automobile Engineering
 Department of Textile Engineering
 Department of Refrigeration/AC Engineering
 Department of Garments Design and Patternmaking
Faculty of Marine Engineering
 Department of Marine Engineering
 Department of Shipbuilding Engineering

Diploma courses

Workshop and laboratories

Shyamoli Ideal Polytechnic Institute workshop and laboratories
 Textile Laboratory
 Automobile Laboratory 
 Technical Laboratory 
 Mechanical Laboratory 
 Computer Laboratory 
 Physics Laboratory 
 Chemistry Laboratory 
 Marine Laboratory 
 Ship Building Laboratory 
 Telecommunications Laboratory 
 Basic Workshop Laboratory 
 Electronic Laboratory 
 Garments and Pattern Making Laboratory

Affiliation 
Shyamoli Ideal Polytechnic Institute is a Private technical education institute run by the Bangladesh Technical Education Board under the Government of the People's Republic of Bangladesh.

Admission eligibility 
SSC / equivalent pass

Campus

SIPI has four campuses 
Dhaka Campus, 14/26, Shahjahan Road, Town Hall (Near Kacha Bazar), Mohammadpur, Dhaka-1207
Chittagong Campus, 225 / A, CDA Avenue, Forest Gate, Muradpur, Chittagong
Rangpur Campus, Tajhat Road, Alamnagar, Rangpur Sadar, Rangpur
Lakshmipur Campus, Ideal Building (adjacent to Jhumur Hall), Lakshmipur Sadar, Lakshmipur

See also 
 Bangladesh Technical Education Board
 Daffodil Polytechnic Institute
 Dhaka Polytechnic Institute
 Chittagong Polytechnic Institute
 Bangladesh Sweden Polytechnic Institute

References 

Engineering universities and colleges in Bangladesh
Polytechnic institutes in Bangladesh
Dhaka District